Colquechaca (in hispanicized spelling) or Qullqichaka (Quechua qullqi silver, money, chaka bridge, "silver bridge") is the first municipal section of the Chayanta Province in the Potosí Department in Bolivia. Its seat is Colquechaca.

Subdivision 
The municipality consists of the following cantons: 
 Ayoma
 Colquechaca
 Macha
 Rosario
 Surumi

The people 
The people are predominantly indigenous citizens of Quechua descent.

References

External links 
Colquechaca Municipality: population data and map

Municipalities of Potosí Department